The German snorkeling badge is a badge awarded for proficiency in snorkeling. It functions as a preparation for scuba diving certification courses. 
The badge is awarded either by the DLRG or the Wasserwacht of the German Red Cross.

Requirements
Requirements by the DLRG:

Prerequisites
 At least 12 years old
 Medical fitness for diving
 Completion of rescue swimming badge in bronze

Written test
 Written exam
 Proficiency in hand gestures

Swim test
 600 meter swim with fins (3 different strokes)
 200 meter swim with one fin
 30 meter underwater swim on one breath
 Holding breath under water for 30 seconds
 Taking off mask, putting mask back on under water
 Diving to depth of three meters three times in one minute
 Combination of:
 50 meter swim with fins, diving to 3-5 meter depth and retrieving a 5 kg ring
 Pulling a partner for 50 meters
 3 minutes of demonstrating CPR

See also
 List of German Sports Badges
 German rescue swimming badge

References
  (in German)

snorkeling badge